Ackerman Ridge is a prominent rock ridge forming the northwest extremity of the La Gorce Mountains of the Queen Maud Mountains. Discovered and roughly mapped in December 1934 by the Byrd Antarctic Expedition geological party under Quin Blackburn. Named by Advisory Committee on Antarctic Names (US-ACAN) for Lieutenant Ronnie J. Ackerman, navigator of U.S. Navy Squadron VX-6 during Operation Deep Freeze 1965 and 1966.

There are three spurs on the south-western side of Ackerman Ridge, including Surprise Spur.

Ridges of Marie Byrd Land
Queen Maud Mountains